Abdullino (Abdulla) is a rural locality (a village) in Semenkinsky Selsoviet of Aurgazinsky District, Bashkortostan, Russia. The population was 91 as of 2010. There is 1 street.

Geography 
Abdullino is located 32 km southwest of Tolbazy (the district's administrative centre) by road. Shlanly is the nearest rural locality.

Ethnicity 
The village is inhabited by Chuvash people and others.

References 

Rural localities in Aurgazinsky District